Book of Tells (subtitled Five Pieces for String Quartet) is an album by violinist Mark Feldman which was released on the Enja label in 2001.

Reception

In a review for Allmusic, Blair Sanderson stated that "As versatile a composer as he is a performer and recording artist, Mark Feldman demonstrates extraordinary skills and a wide range of expressions in Book of Tells".

Track listing
All compositions by Mark Feldman except as indicated
 "Windsor Quartet" - 15:14  
 "Kit Suite (Kit / Les Tenebrides / Murmur)" (Feldman/Sylvie Courvoisier/Feldman) - 10:54  
 "Xanax" - 4:53  
 "Book Of Tells" - 10:59  
 "Real Joe" - 8:09

Personnel
Mark Feldman - violin
Erik Friedlander - cello 
Joyce Hammann - violin (track 1), viola (tracks 2-5)
Cenovia Cummins - violin (tracks 2-5)
Lois Martin  - viola (track 1)

References 

Enja Records albums
Mark Feldman albums
2001 albums